George Kringelbach (16 June 1927 – 11 May 1979) was a Danish journalist and gastronome.

Biography

Family history
Kringelbach was born on 16 June 1927 as the seventh child of journalist and editor cand. phil. Arne Kringelbach and wife Charlotte Cathrine Cecilie née Esbensen in the family's home at Vodroffsplads 12, Copenhagen and on 28 August he was baptized Georg Kringelbach in St. Mark's Church, Copenhagen.

In 1929 the family had moved to Vesterbrogade 33-2.

On Palm Sunday 1941 Kringelbach was confirmed in Christian's Church, Copenhagen while residing with the family at Torvegade 50-2.

On 24 July 1948 in Godthaab Church, Copenhagen Kringelbach married Else Ida née Sørensen, residing as a journalist at Viborgvej 12, Horsens. Both his parents were deceased.

On 19 June 1952 he divorced and on 20 February 1953 in Copenhagen City Hall he remarried TV producer Gerda née Ullmann, residing as a journalist in Helmer Søgårds Alle 24, Kastrup.

On 17 November 1960 he divorced again and on 8 December 1960 in Copenhagen City Hall he remarried Aase née Zachariassen, residing as an editor in Rådhusstræde 8.

On 16 June 1969 Kringelbach formally left the Church of Denmark.

In 1972 Kringelbach played a chief psychiatrist in the movie  (Dangerous Kisses).

On 13 February 1979 Kringelbach's birth record was updated to reflect that his name is George Kringelbach.

Kringelbach died 11 May 1979, aged 51, and is buried in Søllerød Cemetery.

Career
After training with Harlang & Toksvig as a copywriter, he was employed by Svendborg Avis in 1945, by Horsens Folkeblad in 1947, and by the press office of the Danish Liberal Party in 1950. From 1954, he worked freelance before being taken on by Dagens Nyheder in 1959. After working as a correspondent in France and Spain, he returned to Denmark in 1963 where he worked for Danmarks Radio's P3 radio programme. He became famous for hypnotising listeners to give up smoking.

On 10 October 1963 Kringelbach revealed in his radio programme Natredaktionen on P3 that Sven Hassel in reality was a pen name for the convicted traitor Børge Willy Redsted Pedersen.

From April 1965, he was employed by Ekstra Bladet and in his later years he worked as the food editor for Politiken.

Bibliography (selected)

References

External links

1927 births
1979 deaths
People from Copenhagen
Danish male writers
Cookbook writers
Gastronomes
Danish male film actors
20th-century Danish male actors
20th-century Danish journalists